Schaufelberger is a Swiss-German surname. Notable people with the name include:

 Albert Schaufelberger (1949–1983), Lieutenant Commander in the United States Navy
 Heinz Schaufelberger (born 1947), Swiss chess master
 Philipp Schaufelberger (born 1970), Swiss jazz guitarist and composer
 Silvio Schaufelberger (born 1977), Swiss bobsledder
 Werner Schaufelberger (born 1935), Swiss sprinter

Swiss-German surnames